Toabré is a corregimiento in Penonomé District, Coclé Province, Panama with a population of 10,203 as of 2010. Its population as of 1990 was 8,975; its population as of 2000 was 9,534.

References

Corregimientos of Coclé Province